Link Labs is an American asset-tracking technology company headquartered in Annapolis, Maryland. In 2014, a group of veteran engineers from the Johns Hopkins University Applied Physics Lab founded the company that is now an award-winning innovator in low-power, wide-area network devices. The startup first began primarily offering solutions to the hospitality industry, but within the last couple of years has diversified into other industries such as construction, healthcare, logistics, manufacturing, and warehousing. Link Labs places emphasis on offering businesses an affordable, unique solution that has proven results.

History 
The company was founded in 2014 by Brian Ray and three engineers from the Johns Hopkins Applied Physics Laboratory. In August 2015, it announced a venture capital investment of $5.7 million. The investment round was led by TCP and joined by the Maryland Venture Fund, Blu Venture, Inflection Point Partners, and others.

Products

AirFinder OnSite  is an indoor real-time location system (RTLS) that uses software-based technology to track assets and individuals in campus-based environments. AirFinder OnSite can be used for equipment monitoring, inventory management, and loss prevention. Link Labs has used AirFinder OnSite to service the following industries: healthcare, hospitality, manufacturing, commercial construction, and supply chain and logistics.

AirFinder Everywhere is a cloud-based software system that uses RTLS technology to track assets and individuals across outdoor, indoor, and hybrid environments. AirFinder Everywhere can be used to improve compliance, process efficiencies, loss prevention, and inventory management. Link Labs has used AirFinder Everywhere to service the following industries: industrial racking and containers, home healthcare, transportation and logistics, field service and maintenance, and equipment rental.

Symphony Link is a low power, wide area network (LPWAN) that allows AirFinder to securely locate and monitor assets. Its decentralized architecture allows it to process data locally, and its public key infrastructure (PKI) and Advanced Encryption Standard (AES) secure transmitted data. Symphony Link’s firmware over-the-air allows it to patch security issues internally, without human intervention. Symphony Link’s real-time data adaptive rate allows it to adjust the size of messages based on network capabilities, ensuring the reliable transmission of data even if a link is weak.

In the News/Press 

 In August 2015, Link Labs partnered with Stream Technologies, allowing customers a more robust subscription, billing, and data management platform.
 In June 2016, the Stanley Mechanical Solutions unit division of Stanley Black & Decker unveiled its Shelter system, an IoT-enabled school safety system. Link Labs worked in partnership with Stanley Mechanical to create a technological solution with extended battery life, quick response time, and long-range signal capability.
 In October 2016, M2M Spectrum Networks announced plans to purchase up to 10,000 base stations.
 In November 2016, Link Labs announced via press release that it is developing a Cat M1 fully integrated sensor suite—using Sequans Monarch chipsets—for Verizon's LTE network.
 In January 2021, Link Labs announces the availability of the AirFinder super tag Pro evaluation kit.
 In February 2021, Link Labs announced its AirFinder Supertag Pro Evaluation Kit.
 In March 2021, Link Labs launches IoT Asset Tracking platform with affordable unprecedented up to meter level accuracy.
 In April 2021: Link Labs awarded six patents for software engineering innovations in AirFinder OnSite.
 In May 2021, Link Labs won Stevie Award for best new business technology product for the supply chain management.
 In June 2021, The IoT Community TM (Internet of Things Community), the world’s largest community of CXOs and IoT professionals and practitioners, announces Link Labs has joined its elite ecosystem as a Gold-level corporate member.
 In  August 2021, Link Labs releases its patented Xtreme low energy technology that dramatically boosts battery life.
 In October 2021, Link Labs’ AirFinder OnSite wins IoT Platform of the Year in 2021  Mobile Breakthrough Awards.
 In December 2021, Link Labs launches its rechargeable SuperTag IoT device to enhance efficiency and cost-effectiveness of indoor, outdoor, and on-the-move asset tracking.
 In January 2022, Link Labs wins 2022 BIG Innovation Awards  presented by Business Intelligence Group.
 In March 2022, Link Labs launched an attack on supply chain disruptions via CIG.
 In April 2022, Link Labs was featured in the RFID Journal on “What’s to Come for IoT Asset Tracking and Monitoring in 2022”.

Industries 
Link Labs real-time location system (RTLS) AirFinder provides many benefits to a variety of industries, through its asset tracking and monitoring. The industries Link Labs serves include, but are not limited to, the following:

Construction  With AirFinder, the tracking of valuable assets, such as workers, tools, and material is easily done. By tracking these assets, construction companies can increase productivity, reduce theft, and have greater cost-savings.

Equipment rental  With AirFinder, equipment rental companies know the location of their rentals at all times. Knowing the location of their assets, equipment rental companies will be able to give a more accurate availability to their customers.

Healthcare  With AirFinder, doctors and nurses can locate the right medicine, equipment, and even person when they need to–saving time and helping to save lives.

Hospitality  With AirFinder, both the staff and guests of hotels have additional protection. With the proper AirFinder tag fitted, staff has access to an emergency panic button that gives their exact location in case they are in danger or a guest is in danger.

Logistics  With AirFinder, logistics companies increase the efficiency of their operations, as AirFinder tags are able to not only track the location of an asset but also give the condition of an asset. AirFinder tags, along with giving the location of an asset, also give the temperature, humidity, noise, shock, and pressure of an asset.

Manufacturing  With AirFinder, manufacturers increase their efficiency as they track their assets throughout the manufacturing process–providing a more detailed work-in-progress analysis.

Warehouse  With AirFinder, warehouses have a detailed view of their workers, inventory, and equipment and machinery. With these additional details, the accuracy of the warehouse operations increases, which can lead to higher productivity.

Awards 

 The BIG Innovation Award: The BIG Innovation Award recognizes Link Labs commercial AirFinder SuperTag IoT device for its power efficiency, flexibility, ease of deployment and affordability. 
 2021 IoT Excellence Award: IoT Evolution Excellence Award (AirFinder SuperTag) Link Labs commercial IoT tracking device, AirFinder SuperTag, is recognized by IoT Evolution World for excellence in innovation.  
 2021 Bronze Steve Award "Best New Business Technology for Supply Chain Management": 2021 Bronze Steve Award Link Labs’ AirFinder SuperTag Wins a 2021 Stevie Award Winner for Best New Business Technology Product for Supply Chain Management. 
 2021 People's Choice Stevie Awards "Favorite New Business Technology Product for Supply Chain Management": 2021 People’s Choice Stevie Award Link Labs’ AirFinder SuperTag Wins a 2021 People’s Choice Stevie Award for Favorite New Tech Product for Supply Chain Management at 19th Annual American Business Awards. 
 IoT Evolution 2021 Product of the Year: IoT Evolution Product of the Year Link Labs’ AirFinder OnSite IoT Asset Tracking Platform Wins IoT Evolution World’s 2021 IoT Product of the Year Award. 
 2021 Asset Tracking Award: Asset Tracking Award Link Labs’ AirFinder Wins 2021 Asset Tracking Award Presented by IoT Evolution World and IoT Evolution Magazine. 
 2021 Worldfestival Innovation Awards, World Impact & Environment (USA): WORLDFESTIVAL Innovation Awards Link Labs was nominated for the 2021 WORDFESTIVAL Innovation Awards. 
 2021 Mobile Breakthrough Awards IoT Platform of the Year: 2021 Mobile Breakthrough Awards Link Labs’ AirFinder OnSite Wins IoT Platform of the Year in 2021 Mobile Breakthrough Awards.

References 

Information technology companies of the United States
Internet of things companies
Wireless networking